Mya Hollingshed is a Puerto Rican professional basketball player. She was drafted by the Las Vegas Aces of the WNBA in 2022. She played college basketball at the University of Colorado.

High school
Hollingshed was a four-year letterwinner at Bellaire High School. She was a team captain and earned all-state honors. Hollingshed was a McDonald's All-American nominee and competed with the Texas Elite Phenoms AAU.

Hollingshed was an Adidas and Under Armor All-American.

College career
Hollingshed was a reserve player her freshman year, averaging 6.8 points and 3.9 rebounds over 29 games. She led the team with a 42.7% 3-point shooting accuracy, and she shot 45.5% from the floor.

Hollingshed started every game as a sophomore and had career-high numbers in points per game and minutes, and she led the team with a .439 field goal percentage. Hollingshed recorded her first double double as a sophomore.

As a junior, Hollingshed posted career-high points, rebounds, and assists totals and had three double-doubles. She led the team in scoring and rebounding and was tied for team lead in steals. She was named to the preseason All-PAC 12 team as an honorable mention.

Hollingshed joined the 1,000 point club as a senior and scored in double figures in 20 of 23 games. Hollingshed was selected to the All-PAC 12 First Team and received an All-America honorable mention. She led Colorado to their first NCAA Tournament berth in years.

Professional career
Hollingshed was picked by the Las Vegas Aces 8th overall in the 2022 WNBA Draft. She was the sixth University of Colorado player ever drafted and the first since 2013.
She was waived by the team only a few weeks after being drafted.

International Play
Hollingshed represents Puerto Rico in international play. She competed in the 2022 FIBA World Cup. She led Puerto Rico to its first quarterfinals.

Personal life
Hollingshed was born in Houston, Texas.

References 

Living people
Colorado Buffaloes women's basketball players
Las Vegas Aces draft picks
Puerto Rican women's basketball players
Year of birth missing (living people)